Sharifah Mazlina binti Syed Abdul Kadir (born 23 May 1965) is a Malaysian woman solo explorer. In 2004, she became the first Asian woman to travel to the South Pole. She reached the North Pole in 2007.

Controversies 
Sharifah Mazlina received the title of 'Darjah Mahkota Johor Yang Amat Mulia Pangkat Pertama Dato' Sri Paduka Mahkota Johor ((SPMJ') on Nov 2005 and 'Pangkat Kedua Dato' Paduka Mahkota Johor (DPMJ)' in March 2004.

On 18 Dec 2019,Johor Royal court council stated her titles were revoked by Sultan of Johor since 2010 thus she no longer has the right to use it.

References

External links
Sharifah's webpages

Living people
1953 births
Malaysian people of Malay descent
Malaysian people of Arab descent
Malaysian Muslims